Pseudocotalpa sonorica is a species of shining leaf chafer in the family of beetles known as Scarabaeidae. It is endemic to the Algodones Dunes in North America.

References

Further reading

 
 

Rutelinae
Insects of Mexico
Beetles of the United States
Beetles described in 1974
Articles created by Qbugbot